Virginie is a 1962 French comedy film directed by Jean Boyer and starring Roger Pierre, Jean-Marc Thibault and Michèle Girardon.

Synopsis
Two friends, a journalist and a scientist, plan to sail to Argentina for an expedition of discovery, but their plans are thrown into confusion when they rescue two attractive women.

Cast
 Roger Pierre as Pierre
 Jean-Marc Thibault as Olivier
 Michèle Girardon as Betty
 Mireille Darc as Brigitte

References

Bibliography 
 Jean-Pierre Mattei. La Corse, les Corses et le cinéma: cinquante ans de cinéma parlant, 1929–1980, Volume 2. A. Piazzola, 2008.

External links 
 

1962 films
French comedy films
1962 comedy films
1960s French-language films
Films directed by Jean Boyer
Seafaring films
1960s French films